Tolomeo (Italian, 'Ptolemy') is an opera seria by Handel.

Tolomeo may also refer to:

Ptolemy (name), including a list of people named Tolomeo
Tolomeo (horse) (1980 – circa 2000), a Thoroughbred racehorse
Tolomeo desk lamp, an iconic Italian desk lamp design

See also
Ptolemy (disambiguation)
Tolomeo e Alessandro, an opera by Scarlatti